Vasyl Dmytrovych Yermylov (1894–1968) was a Ukrainian  painter, avant-garde artist and designer. His genres included cubism, constructivism, and neo-primitivism.

Biography
 Vasyl Yermylov was born 22 March 1894 in the city of Kharkiv, Ukraine.
 In 1910 he studied at the School for Applied Art in Kharkiv, and had lessons in the studio of Eduard Steinberg, having an interest in fresco painting and mosaic work.
 From 1911 to 1912 he was a member of the Golubaya Liliya (Blue Lily) in Kharkiv.
 In 1912 he attended the Moscow School of Painting, Sculpture and Architecture. In the same year he met Vladimir Mayakovsky and David Burliuk.
 In 1913 he had training in the studios of Ilya Mashkov and Pyotr Konchalovsky in Moscow.
 In 1913–1914 he was a member of the group Budiak (Weed), Kharkiv.
 In 1914 Yermylov returned to the School for Applied Art (Kharkiv) where he graduated with a Diploma in Decorative Painting.
 In 1918 he founded the group League of Seven, together with the artist Maria Sinyakova. In the same year he had an exhibition with the group League of Seven (Kharkiv).
 In 1919 he founded the Industrial Teacher Workshop (Kharkiv).
 In 1920 Yermylov became head of the Ukrainian Telegraph Agency for Propaganda Purpose (UKROSTA) project.

 In 1920 he became decorator for the agitprop movement Red Ukraine and the Club of the Red Army (Kharkiv).
 In 1922 he was a co-founder of the Technical Art Institute in Kharkiv.
 In 1925 Vasyl Yermylov became the member of the Association of the Revolutionary Art of the Ukraine (ARMU), together with Vadym Meller, Alexander Bogomazov, Victor Palmov and others.
 In 1928 Yermylov participated in the International Press Exhibition Pressa, Cologne, together with El Lissitzky, Vadym Meller and Aleksandr Tyshler.
 In 1928–1929 he was the artistic director of the magazine Avantgarde, and also made designs for book covers, illustrations for Ukrainian magazines, and designs for interiors.
 From 1944 to 1947 he was the teacher at the National Art Institute in Kharkiv.
 From 1963 to 1967 Yermylov continued to teach at the National Art Institute (Kharkiv).
 Vasyl Yermylov died 6 January 1968 in Kharkiv.
Other sources have his date of death as 7 January 1968).

Influence 
On March 22, 2012, the first center of modern art, named "Yermilov Center", opened in Kharkiv.

In 2018, Ukrainian creative agency Banda created the Yermylov Bold typeface, which was used specifically in the Ukraine NOW brand. The author of the typeface was inspired by the works of Ukrainian constructivist artist Vasyl Yermylov.

Selected works

 posters and decoration for May Day 1919–1920
 design for the Red Ukraine agit-train 1921
 worked on the design of the Ukrainian stand at the World Exhibition of Graphic Art (Cologne) 1928
 Interior design of Pioneers Palace, Kharkiv 1933-1934
 Interior design of Defence Building, Kyiv 1935-1936

Exhibitions
2012, Vasyl Yermylov. 1894-1968 , Multimedia Art Museum, Moscow

See also
Yermilov Centre

Notes and references

Bibliography 
 Short biography in English
 “Єрмилов Василь Дмитрович” (Short biography in Ukrainian)

1894 births
1968 deaths
Artists from Kharkiv
Russian artists
Neo-primitivism
Ukrainian avant-garde
20th-century Ukrainian painters
20th-century Ukrainian male artists
Ukrainian male painters
Moscow School of Painting, Sculpture and Architecture alumni